Li Hong (652–675) was a crown prince the Chinese Tang Dynasty. Li Hong may also refer to:

Li Ying (prince), his grandnephew, the crown prince of Emperor Xuanzong of Tang and also known as Li Hong
Li Hong (Taoist eschatology), Taoist messianic figure
Li Hong (field hockey), Chinese field hockey player
Li Hong (racewalker) (born 1979), Chinese racewalking athlete and winner at the 2000 Asian Athletics Championships
Li Hong (footballer), Chinese footballer
Zhang Jianhong, Chinese writer using pen name Li Hong